Corpus Christi is the second full-length album by the Finnish ambient, neofolk, and metal band Syven. It was released on December 6, 2012, through Audiokratik.

Track listing

Credits
Aslak Tolonen – all instruments
Andy Koski-Semmens – vocals

References

External links

2012 albums
Syven albums